Nychioptera is a genus of moths of the family Erebidae. The genus was erected by John G. Franclemont in 1966.

Species
 Nychioptera accola Franclemont, 1966
 Nychioptera noctuidalis Dyar, 1907
 Nychioptera opada Franclemont, 1966

References

Boletobiinae
Noctuoidea genera